1964 in philosophy

Events 
 Jean-Paul Sartre was awarded the Nobel Prize in Literature, but he declined it, stating that a writer must "refuse to let himself be transformed into an institution, even if this occurs under the most honorable circumstances". 
 The Sigmund Freud Prize was inaugurated in 1964.

Publications 
 Lon L. Fuller, The Morality of Law (1964)
 Mao Zedong, Quotations from Chairman Mao (1964)
 Herbert Marcuse, One-Dimensional Man (1964)
 Marshall McLuhan, Understanding Media: The Extensions of Man (1964)
 Jürgen Moltmann, Theology of Hope (1964)

Births 
 December 8 - Richard David Precht 
 December 30 - Christof Rapp

Deaths 
 March 18 - Norbert Wiener (born 1894)
 April 14 - Rachel Carson (born 1907)
 April 23 - Karl Polanyi (born 1886)

References 

Philosophy
20th-century philosophy
Philosophy by year